Remick is a surname. Notable people with the surname include:

Dylan Remick (born 1991), American soccer player
Elinor Remick Warren (1900–1991), American composer 
Glenn Remick (1951–2009), American darts player
Jerome Remick (1928–2005), Canadian numismatist
Jerome H. Remick (1867–1931), American music publisher
Lee Remick (1935–1991), American actress